Tamil culture is the culture of the Tamil people. Tamil culture is rooted in the arts and ways of life of Tamils in India, Sri Lanka, Malaysia, Singapore, and across the globe. Tamil culture is expressed in language, literature, music, dance, theatre, folk arts, martial arts, painting, sculpture, architecture, sports, media, comedy, cuisine, costumes, celebrations, philosophy, religions, traditions, rituals, organizations, science, and technology.

Language and literature 

Tamils have strong attachment to the Tamil language, which is often venerated in literature as "Tamil̲an̲n̲ai", "the Tamil mother".  It has historically been, and to large extent still is, central to the Tamil identity. Like the other languages of South India, it is unrelated to the Indo-European languages of northern India. The Tamil language preserves many features of Proto-Dravidian, though modern-day spoken Tamil in Tamil Nadu freely uses loanwords from Sanskrit and English and vice versa. Also, the language does not have many commonly used alphabets in the English language and Hindi (a product of Sanskrit and written in Devanagri script). Tamil literature is of considerable antiquity, and is recognised as a classical language by the government of India. Classical Tamil literature, which ranges from lyric poetry to works on poetics and ethical philosophy, is remarkably different from contemporary and later literature in other Indian languages, and represents the oldest body of secular literature in South-east Asia.

Religion

Tamil religious texts

The ancient Tamil grammatical work of the Tolkappiyam and the Sangam works of the Ten Idylls (Pattuppāṭṭu) and the Eight Anthologies (Eṭṭuttokai) shed light on early religion of ancient Dravidian people. Murugan was glorified as, the god of war, who is ever young and resplendent, as the favored god of the Tamils.       Sivan was also seen as the supreme God. Early iconography of Murugan and Sivan and their association with native flora and fauna goes back to Indus Valley Civilization. The Sangam landscape was classified into five categories, thinais, based on the mood, the season and the land. Tolkappiyam, mentions that each of these thinai had an associated deity such Seyyon in Kurinji-the hills, Thirumal in Mullai-the forests,  and Venthan in Marutham-the plains,
Kotravai in Palai-the desert and Wanji-ko/kadalon in the Neithal-the coasts and the seas. Other gods mentioned were Mayyon who were all assimilated into Hinduism over time.  Dravidian influence on early Vedic religion is evident, many of these features are already present in the oldest known Indo-Aryan language, the language of the Rigveda (c. 1500 BCE), which also includes over a dozen words borrowed from Dravidian. This represents an early religious and cultural fusion or synthesis between ancient Dravidians and Indo-Aryans, which became more evident over time with sacred iconography, flora and fauna that went on to influence Hinduism, Buddhism and Jainism.

Demographics
About 88% of the population of Tamil Nadu are Hindus. Christians and Muslims account for 6% and 5.5% respectively. The majority of Muslims in Tamil Nadu speak Tamil, with less than 15% of them reporting Urdu as their mother tongue. Tamil Jains number only a few thousand now. Atheist, rationalist, and humanist philosophies are also adhered by sizeable minorities, as a result of Tamil cultural revivalism in the 20th century, and its antipathy to what it saw as Brahminical Hinduism.

Tamil Jains constitute around 0.13% of the population of Tamil Nadu. Many of the rich Tamil literature works were written by Jains. According to George L. Hart, the legend of the Tamil Sangams or "literary assemblies" was based on the Jain sangham at Madurai.

Deities and veneration
The most popular deity is Murugan, he is known as the patron god of the Tamils and is also called "Tamil Kadavul" (Tamil God). In Tamil tradition, Murugan is the youngest son and Ganesha/Pillayar is the eldest son of Shiva/Sivan, and it is different from the North Indian tradition, which represents Murugan as the eldest son. The goddess Parvati is often depicted as a goddess with green skin complexion in Tamil Hindu tradition. The worship of Amman, also called Mariamman, is thought to have been derived from an ancient mother goddess, is also very common. Kan̲n̲agi, the heroine of the Cilappatikār̲am, is worshipped as Pattin̲i by many Tamils, particularly in Sri Lanka. There are also many followers of Ayyavazhi in Tamil Nadu, mainly in the southern districts. In addition, there are many temples and devotees of Vishnu, Siva, Ganapathi, and the other Hindu deities.
Muslims across Tamil Nadu follow Hanafi and Shafi'i schools. Most Tamil Muslims are Shadhilis. Erwadi in Ramanathapuram district and Nagore in Nagapattinam district are the major pilgrimage centres for Muslims in Tamil Nadu.

In rural Tamil Nadu, many local deities, called aiyyan̲ārs, are thought to be the spirits of local heroes who protect the village from harm. Their worship often centres around nadukkal, stones erected in memory of heroes who died in battle. This form of worship is mentioned frequently in classical literature and appears to be the surviving remnants of an ancient Tamil tradition.

The Saivist sect of Hinduism is significantly represented amongst Tamils, more so among Sri Lankan Tamils, although most of the Saivist places of religious significance are in northern India. The Alvars and Nayanars, who were predominantly Tamils, played a key role in the renaissance of Bhakti tradition in India. In the 10th century, the philosopher Ramanuja, who propagated the theory of Visishtadvaitam, brought many changes to worshiping practices, creating new regulations on temple worship, and accepted lower-caste Hindus as his prime disciples.

Festivals
The most important Tamil festivals are Pongal, a harvest festival that occurs in mid-January, and Puthandu, the Tamil New Year, which occurs on 14 April. Both are celebrated by almost all Tamils, regardless of religion. The Hindu festival Deepavali is celebrated with fanfare; other local Hindu festivals include Thaipusam, Panguni Uttiram, and Adiperukku. While Adiperukku is celebrated with more pomp in the Cauvery region than in others, the Ayyavazhi Festival, Ayya Vaikunda Avataram, is predominantly celebrated in the southern districts of Kanyakumari District, Tirunelveli, and Thoothukudi.

Tamil traditions  
Various martial arts including Adimurai, Kuttu Varisai, Varma Kalai, Silambam, Adithada, Malyutham and Kalarippayattu, are practised in Tamil Nadu and Kerala. The warm-up phase includes yoga, meditation and breathing exercises. Silambam originated in ancient Tamilakam and was patronized by the Pandyans, Cholas and Cheras, who ruled over this region. Silapathigaram, a Tamil literature from the 2nd century AD, refers to the sale of Silamabam instructions, weapons and equipment to foreign traders. Since the early Sangam age, there was a warlike culture in South India. War was regarded as an honorable sacrifice and fallen heroes and kings were worshiped in the form of a Hero stone. Each warrior was trained in martial arts, horse riding and specialized in two of the weapons of that period Vel (spear) Val (sword) and Vil (bow). Heroic martyrdom was glorified in ancient Tamil literature. The Tamil kings and warriors followed an honour code similar to that of Japanese Samurais and committed suicide to save the honor. The forms of martial suicide were known as Avipalli, Thannai, Verttal, Marakkanchi, Vatakkiruttal and Punkilithu Mudiyum Maram. Avipalli was mentioned in all the works except Veera Soliyam. It was a self-sacrifice of a warrior to the goddess of war for the victory of his commander. The Tamil rebels in Sri Lanka reflected some elements of Tamil martial traditions which included worship of fallen heroes (Maaveerar Naal) and practice of martial suicide. They carried a Suicide pill around their neck to escape the captivity and torture. A remarkable feature besides to their willingness to sacrifice is, that they were well organized and disciplined. It was forbidden for the rebels to consume tobaccos, alcohols, drugs and to have sexual relationship.

The Wootz steel originated in South India and Sri Lanka.  There are several ancient Tamil, Greek, Chinese and Roman literary references to high carbon Indian steel since the time of Alexander's India campaign. The crucible steel production process started in the sixth century BC, at production sites of Kodumanal in Tamil Nadu, Golconda in Andhra Pradesh, Karnataka and Sri Lanka and exported globally; the Tamils of the Chera Dynasty producing what was termed the finest steel in the world, i.e. Seric Iron to the Romans, Egyptians, Chinese and Arabs by 500 BC. The steel was exported as cakes of steely iron that came to be known as "Wootz."

The Tamilakam method was to heat black magnetite ore in the presence of carbon in a sealed clay crucible inside a charcoal furnace. An alternative was to smelt the ore first to give wrought iron, then heated and hammered to be rid of slag. The carbon source was bamboo and leaves from plants such as Avārai. The Chinese and locals in Sri Lanka adopted the production methods of creating Wootz steel from the Chera Tamils by the 5th century BC. In Sri Lanka, this early steel-making method employed a unique wind furnace, driven by the monsoon winds, capable of producing high-carbon steel and production sites from antiquity have emerged, in places such as Anuradhapura, Tissamaharama and Samanalawewa, as well as imported artifacts of ancient iron and steel from Kodumanal. A 200 BC Tamil trade guild in Tissamaharama, in the South East of Sri Lanka, brought with them some of the oldest iron and steel artifacts and production processes to the island from the classical period. The Arabs introduced the South Indian/Sri Lankan wootz steel to Damascus, where an industry developed for making weapons of this steel. The 12th century Arab traveler Edrisi mentioned the "Hinduwani" or Indian steel as the best in the world. Another sign of its reputation is seen in a Persian phraseto give an "Indian answer", meaning "a cut with an Indian sword." Wootz steel was widely exported and traded throughout ancient Europe and the Arab world, and became particularly famous in the Middle East.

Traditional Weapons 

The Tamil martial arts also includes various types of weapons.
 Valari (throwing iron sickle)
 Maduvu (deer horns)
 Surul Vaal (curling blade)
 Vaal (sword) + Ketayam (shield)
 Itti or Vel (spear)
 Savuku (whip)
 Kattari (fist blade) 
 Veecharuval (battle Machete)
 Silambam (long bamboo staff)
 Kuttu Katai (spiked knuckleduster)
 Katti (dagger/knife)
 Vil (bow) 
 Tantayutam (mace)
 Soolam (trident)
 Theekutchi (flaming baton)
 Yeratthai Mulangkol (dual stick)
 Yeretthai Vaal (dual sword)

Visual art and architecture 

Most traditional art are religious in some form and usually centres on Hinduism, although the religious element is often only a means to represent universal—and, occasionally, humanist—themes. 

The most important form of Tamil painting is Tanjore painting, which originated in Thanjavur in the 9th century. The painting's base is made of cloth and coated with zinc oxide, over which the image is painted using dyes; it is then decorated with semi-precious stones, as well as silver or gold thread. A style which is related in origin, but which exhibits significant differences in execution, is used for painting murals on temple walls; the most notable example are the murals on the Kutal Azhakar and Meenakshi temples of Madurai, the Brihadeeswarar temple of Tanjore.

Tamil sculpture ranges from elegant stone sculptures in temples, to bronze icons with exquisite details. The medieval Chola bronzes are considered to be one of India's greatest contributions to the world art. Unlike most Western art, the material in Tamil sculpture does not influence the form taken by the sculpture; instead, the artist imposes his/her vision of the form on the material. As a result, one often sees in stone sculptures flowing forms that are usually reserved for metal.

Music 

Tamil country has its own music form called Tamil Pannisai, from which current carnatic music evolved. Has its own music troops like Urumi melam, Pandi melam (present day's chenda melam), Mangala Vathiyam, Kailaya vathiyam etc.,. Ancient Tamil works, such as the Silappatikaram, describe a system of music, and a 7th-century Pallava inscription at Kudimiyamalai contains one of the earliest surviving examples of Indian music in notation. Contemporary dance forms such as Bharatanatyam have recent origins but are based older temple dance forms known as Sadirattam as practised by courtesans and a class of women known as Devadasis

Performing arts 

Famous Tamil dance styles are

Contemporary dance forms such as Bharatanatyam have recent origins but are based older temple dance forms known as Catir Kacceri as practised by courtesans and a class of women known as Devadasis
One of the Tamil folk dances is karakattam. In its religious form, the dance is performed in front of an image of the goddess Mariamma. The kuravanci is a type of dance-drama, performed by four to eight women. The drama is opened by a woman playing the part of a female soothsayer of the kurava tribe(people of hills and mountains), who tells the story of a lady pining for her lover. The therukoothu, literally meaning "street play", is a form of village theater or folk opera. It is traditionally performed in village squares, with no sets and very simple props. The performances involve songs and dances, and the stories can be either religious or secular. The performances are not formal, and performers often interact with the audience, mocking them, or involving them in the dialogue. Therukkūthu has, in recent times, been very successfully adapted to convey social messages, such as abstinence and anti-caste criticism, as well as information about legal rights, and has spread to other parts of India. Tamil Nadu also has a well developed stage theatre tradition, which has been influenced by western theatre. A number of theatrical companies exist, with repertoires including absurdist, realist, and humorous plays.

Film and theatre arts 

The theatrical culture that flourished Tamil culture during the classical age. Tamil theatre has a long and varied history whose origins can be traced back almost two millennia to dance-theatre forms like Kotukotti and Pandarangam, which are mentioned in an ancient anthology of poems entitled the Kalingathu Parani.

The predominant theatre form of the region is Kattaikkuttu, where performers (historically men) sing, act, dance and are accompanied by musicians on traditional instruments. The majority of performances draw from stories in the Mahabharata, while a few plays take their inspiration from Purana stories.

The modern Tamil film industry originated during the 20th century. Tamil film industry has its headquarters in Chennai and is known under the name Kollywood, it is the second largest film industry in India after Bollywood. Films from Kollywood entertain audiences not only in India but also overseas Tamil diaspora. Tamil films from Chennai have been distributed to various overseas cinemas in Singapore, Sri Lanka, South Africa, Malaysia, Japan, Oceania, the Middle East, Western Europe, and North America. Inspired by Kollywood originated outside India Independent Tamil film production in Sri Lanka, Singapore, Canada, and western Europe. Several Tamil actresses such as Anuisa Ranjan Vyjayanthimala, Hema Malini, Rekha Ganesan, Sridevi, Meenakshi Sheshadri, and Vidya Balan have acted in Bollywood and dominated the cinema over the years. Historical chief ministers of Tamil Nadu, including M. G. Ramachandran, M. Karunanidhi and J. Jayalalithaa, were previously successful personalities in the Tamil film industry.

Jallikattu 

In Ancient times, two bullfighting and bull-racing sports were conducted. 1.Manjuvirattu and 2. Yeruthazhuval.  These sports were organised to keep the people's temperament always fit and ready for the war at any time. Each has its own techniques and rules. These sports acted as one of the criteria to marry girls of warrior family. There were traditions where the winner would be chosen as bridegroom for their daughter or sister.

Gandhirajan, a post-graduate in Art History from Madurai-Kamaraj University, said the ancient Tamil tradition was "manju virattu" (chasing bulls) or "eruthu kattuthal" (lassoing bulls) and it was never "jallikattu," that is baiting a bull or controlling it as the custom obtained today. In ancient Tamil country, during the harvest festival, decorated bulls would be let loose on the "peru vazhi" (highway) and the village youth would take pride in chasing them and outrunning them. Women, elders and children would watch the fun from the sidelines of the "peru vazhi" or streets. Nobody was injured in this. Or the village youth would take delight in lassoing the sprinting bulls with "vadam" (rope). It was about 500 years ago, after the advent of the Nayak rule in Tamil Nadu with its Telugu rulers and chieftains, that this harmless bull-chasing sport metamorphosed into "jallikattu," according to Gandhirajan.

The ancient Tamil art of unarmed bullfighting, popular amongst warriors in the classical period, has also survived in parts of Tamil Nadu, notably Alanganallur near Madurai, where it is known as Jallikattu and is held once a year around the time of the Pongal festival.

See also
 Tamil
 Tamil people

Notes

References

External links
 Tamil Culture

 
Tamil